Janko Sanković, also known as Yanko Sanković, is a Yugoslavian former football goalkeeper who spent much of his career playing in Latin America.

Career
Born in Novi Sad, Sanković played for hometown FK Vojvodina in the 1960s.

Sanković was signed to play for Independiente Santa Fe by then-manager Todor Veselinović in 1970. He played for the club until 1973, appearing in the 1972 Copa Libertadores. He also played in Colombia for Cúcuta Deportivo and Deportes Quindío.

He spent the rest of his career playing in Ecuador with Deportivo Quito, Barcelona Sporting Club, Club Deportivo Carmen Mora and Universidad Católica del Ecuador.

References

Living people
Footballers from Novi Sad
Yugoslav footballers
Yugoslav expatriate footballers
Serbian footballers
FK Vojvodina players
Independiente Santa Fe footballers
Deportes Quindío footballers
S.D. Quito footballers
Barcelona S.C. footballers
Association football goalkeepers
Year of birth missing (living people)
Expatriate footballers in Colombia
Expatriate footballers in Ecuador
Yugoslav expatriate sportspeople in Colombia
Yugoslav expatriate sportspeople in Ecuador